Chris Horwill from the Alstom Grid, Stafford, United Kingdom was named Fellow of the Institute of Electrical and Electronics Engineers (IEEE) in 2014 for contributions to testing and commissioning of flexible AC transmission systems.

References

Fellow Members of the IEEE
Living people
Year of birth missing (living people)
Place of birth missing (living people)